The Monument to 1300 Years of Bulgaria, also known as the Founders of the Bulgarian State Monument (Паметник на създателите на Българската държава), is a large monument built on a plateau above the city of Shumen, Bulgaria.  It was built in 1981 to commemorate the 1300th anniversary of the First Bulgarian Empire.

The monument is built in concrete in a Cubist style, and was designed by Bulgarian sculptors Krum Damyanov and Ivan Slavov.  It is reached by a processional concrete stairway from Shumen, or by road.  It stands at a height of 450 m above sea level and can be seen from 30 km away.

Gallery

References

External links 

High definition video of the Shumen 1300 Years monument

Culture in Shumen
Monuments and memorials in Bulgaria
Buildings and structures completed in 1981
Buildings and structures in Shumen
Tourist attractions in Shumen Province